Mawlawi Mehdi Mujahid (1988 – 17 August 2022) was a rebel of Hazara ethnic background from Afghanistan who led around 200 Hazara fighters during the Balkhab uprising. He was a Taliban commander before rebelling against the Taliban until he was killed on 17 August 2022.

Early life 
Mehdi was born in a small village called Hosh in the Balkhab District of northern Afghanistan to a religious Shia family belonging to the Hazara ethnic group. His father, Morad Mujahid, was a member of Hezbe Wahdat and he fought in the Soviet–Afghan War, which was when Morad began using "Mujahid" as a surname. Mehdi was 8 years old when the Taliban first gained control of Afghanistan in 1996. Three years later, the Taliban captured his home district of Balkhab. He fled with his family to neighboring Iran, returning to Afghanistan after the December 2001 Afghan Interim Administration had been formed. 

Mehdi began attending school and seemed motivated to take over the family farm. But in his early twenties, a Hazara warlord had seized their ancestral lands. In retaliation, Mehdi and friends kidnapped the warlord's son and held him hostage, only returning him after the warlord returned the lands. That night, the warlord's forces surrounded Mehdi's home, and clashes erupted as he tried to escape. Mehdi was hospitalized and then jailed for seven years for kidnapping.

He became more religious and first came in contact with the Taliban while in prison, however, he remained a Shia and did not convert to Sunni Islam.

Taliban career 
In April 2020, the Taliban appointed Mehdi as the head of intelligence in Bamyan Province, and the chief of the Taliban in Sar-e Pol Province, a move which many Taliban members and the Haqqani network were opposed to for many reasons, mainly due to him being a Hazara Shia. The Taliban were accused of using Mehdi to increase their influence among Hazaras and other Shia Muslims. Mehdi was later fired from the Taliban's head of intelligence position in Bamyan after making a speech against the closure of girls' schools, and his persistent demanding of equality for Hazaras and other Shia Muslims. After being fired from his position, he left the Taliban and declared war against them.

Anti-Taliban career 

In 2022, Mehdi announced that he was arming fighters loyal to him which consisted of about 200 Hazara Shias. He also built a monument dedicated to himself and Abdul Ali Mazari in Balkhab, and he also turned more to his Shia Islamist and Hazara nationalist views. His forces ousted the Taliban's district governor and captured the Balkhab district. Mawlawi Ataullah, the Taliban's district governor, fled Balkhab, and Mehdi replaced him with one of his Hazara associates. 

Mehdi Mujahid was supported by the NRF and Hazara politicians Muhammad Mohaqiq of HWIMA and Karim Khalili of Hezbe Wahdat, which Mehdi's father was a member of. 

On 13 June 2022, Mehdi Mujahid gained full control of Balkhab district and his fighters were inflicting heavy damage on the Taliban. He was initially winning the conflict although the Taliban later outnumbered his fighters and retook Balkhab.

Assassination attempt 
On the morning of 25 June 2022, in the midst of the fighting between the Taliban and Mehdi's forces, Mehdi's house in the Hosh village of Balkhab district was targeted by Taliban airstrikes. Mehdi and his family survived, and none of them were injured. However, that same night, the Taliban killed Mohammad Moradi, his wife, and his daughter in Ghor Province. Moradi was a popular anti-Taliban commander. His support for Mehdi Mujahid was seen by the Hasht-e Subh as the reason for the Taliban attack on his house.

Death 
Mehdi Mujahid was killed on 17 August 2022 while he was trying to escape to Iran. It is unclear how he was killed. According to the locals and some Afghan media outlets, Mujahid was caught by the Taliban in the village of Bunyad in Kohsan District where he was arrested and had his identity confirmed before being executed. Two pictures also started circulating on social media which showed Mujahid alive and in the custody of the Taliban before being executed. One picture showed a shaved Mehdi Mujahid wearing a white turban, and another one of him without the turban and surrounded by unknown men, presumably Taliban members.

However, the Taliban's Ministry of Defense had denied local reports suggesting that Mujahid was executed. Taliban officials say that Mujahid was attempting to escape to Iran when their intelligence and border security caught him by the Afghanistan–Iran border and shot him dead. Naeemul Haq Haqqani, Taliban provincial information minister, told AFP that Mujahid was “killed after a conflict” and “rumors that he was captured alive are lies”.

Reaction
Haji Muhammad Mohaqiq, a prominent ethnic Hazara leader who had strongly supported Mehdi through his conflict with the Taliban, condemned the killing of Mehdi Mujahid. He stated that "cold-bloodedly executing a person while he was not taken from war and was an unarmed traveler is against the religious teachings and is a war crime according to the international law."

See also  
 Abdul Ali Mazari
 Commander Shafi Hazara

References  

1988 births
2022 deaths
Hazara people
Afghan warlords
Afghan Shia Muslims
People from Sar-e Pol Province
People killed by the Taliban